The Cizre Bridge is a  long deck-arch bridge, carrying the D.400 across the Tigris river in Cizre, Turkey.

The bridge was built as part of the Turkish State Highway System to improve mobility in the region. Prior to its construction, the only way to cross the Tigris river in Cizre was via car-ferries that caused congestion. With the rising popularity of the automobile in Turkey in the 1950s and 1960s, the need for an uninterrupted crossing grew. The Cizre Bridge was completed in 1968 and at the time was the 2nd longest vehicular bridge in Turkey, after the Birecik Bridge. A request to name the structure Kennedy Bridge was put forward in 1963, but the request was denied.

References

Buildings and structures in Şırnak Province
Road bridges in Turkey
Bridges completed in 1968
Bridges over the Tigris River
1968 establishments in Turkey
Deck arch bridges